Shi Zhiyong may refer to:
Shi Zhiyong (weightlifter, born 1980), Chinese retired weightlifter, born in Longyan, Fujian, who won gold at the men's 62 kg class of 2004 Summer Olympics
Shi Zhiyong (weightlifter, born 1993), Chinese weightlifter, born in Guilin, Guangxi, who won gold at the men's 69 kg class of 2016 Summer Olympics